Adriaan is the Dutch and Afrikaans spelling of the given name Adrian. Before the 19th century the spelling Adriaen was also common, and people used the spelling interchangeably.

Adriaan may refer to:

People

Artists
Adriaen Backer (1635–1684), Dutch portrait painter
Adriaen Cornelisz Beeldemaker (1618–1709), Dutch Golden Age painter
Adriaen de Bie (1593–1668), Flemish painter
Adriaan Bloemaert (c. 1609 – 1666), Dutch painter
Adriaen van Bloemen (1639 – c. 1679), Flemish Baroque painter, printmaker, draughtsman and engraver
Adriaan Bonsel (1918–2011), Dutch composer
Adriaen Brouwer (1605–1638), Flemish genre painter
Adriaen Frans Boudewijns (1644–1719), Flemish landscape painter
Adriaan van der Burg (1693–1733), Dutch painter
Adriaen van der Cabel (1631–1705), Dutch painter of the Dutch school
Adriaen Frans Boudewijns (1644–1719), Flemish landscape painter, draughtsman and etcher
Adriaen Collaert (c. 1560 – 1618), Flemish designer and engraver
Adriaen Coorte (c. 1665 – 1707+), Dutch still life painter
Adriaen Pietersz Crabeth (1510–1553), Dutch Renaissance glass painter
Adriaen van Cronenburg (c. 1525 – 1604+), Dutch portrait painter
Adriaen van Diest (1655–1704), Dutch painter
Adriaan Dortsman (1635–1682), Dutch architect 
Adriaen van Eemont (1626–1662), Dutch still life and landscape painter
Adriaen Foly (1664–1701), Danish painter
Adriaen van Gaesbeeck (1621–1650), Dutch genre painter
Adriaan Geuze (born 1960), Dutch landscape architect
Adriaen de Grijef (1657–1722), Dutch painter
Adriaen Hanneman (1603–1671), Dutch portrait painter
Adriaan Jozef Heymans (1839–1921), Belgian impressionist landscape painter
Adriaen Honich (1643 – c. 1684), Dutch landscape painter
Adriaen Isenbrandt (c.1485–1551), Flemish Northern Renaissance painter
Adriaen Thomasz Key (c. 1544 – c. 1599), Flemish portrait painter
Adriaen Jansz Kraen (1619–1679), Dutch still life painter
Adriaan de Lelie (1755–1820), Dutch painter
Adriaen Cornelisz van Linschoten (1590–1677), Dutch Golden Age painter
Adriaan Luteijn (born 1964), Dutch choreographer
Adriaen Matham (1590–1660), Dutch Golden Age painter, engraver and art dealer
Adriaen van Nieulandt (1587–1658), Dutch painter, draughtsman and engraver
Adriaen van Oolen (c. 1650 – 1709), Dutch bird, landscape and still life painter
Adriaen van Ostade (1610–1685), Dutch genre painter
Adriaen Oudendijck (1677–1704), Dutch landscape painter
Adriaen van Salm (c. 1660 – 1720), Dutch marine draftsman and painter
Adriaen van der Spelt (c. 1630 – 1673), Dutch Golden Age flower painter
Adriaan van Stalbemt (1580–1662), Flemish Baroque painter
Adriaen van Utrecht (1599–1652), Flemish Baroque still life painter
Adriaen Valerius (c. 1575 – 1625), Dutch poet and composer
Adriaen van de Velde (1636–1672), Dutch animal and landscape painter
Adriaen van de Venne (1589–1662), Dutch painter, miniaturist, book-illustrator and designer of political satires
Adriaen Hendriksz Verboom (1627–1673), Dutch Golden Age landscape painter
Adriaan Verbuch (fl. 1600), Dutch Golden Age painter
Adriaen Verdoel (c. 1620 – 1675), Dutch Golden Age painter
Adriaen de Vries (c. 1556 – 1626), Dutch Northern Mannerist sculptor
Adriaan Gerritsz de Vrije (c. 1570 – 1643), Dutch glass painter
Adriaen de Weever (c. 1510 – c. 1590), Flemish Renaissance painter
Adriaen van der Werff (1659–1722), accomplished Dutch painter
Adriaan Willaert (c. 1490 – 1562), Flemish composer

Scholars and scientists
Adriaan Adriaanszoon (1571–1635), Dutch geometer and astronomer
Adriaan Anthonisz (1541–1620), Durtch mathematician and engineer, mayor of Alkmaar, father of above
Adriaan van Baarland (1486–1538), Dutch historian
Adriaan Bax (born 1956), Dutch molecular biophysicist
Adriaan Blaauw (1814–2000), Dutch astronomer
Adriaan Gilles Camper (1759–1820), Dutch mathematics and physicist
Adriaan Fokker (1887–1972), Dutch physicist and musician
Adriaan de Groot (1914–2006), Dutch chess master and psychologist
Adriaan de Groot (born 1973), Dutch computer programmer
Adriaan Heereboord (1613–1661), Dutch philosopher and logician
Adriaen de Jonghe (1511–1575), Dutch physician, classical scholar, translator, lexicographer, etc.
Adriaan Kluit (1735–1807), Dutch linguist
Adriaan Koerbagh (1633–1669), Dutch scholar and writer
Adriaan Kortlandt (1918–2009), Dutch ethologist
Adriaan van Maanen (1884–1946), Dutch–American astronomer
Adriaan Metius (1571–1635), Dutch geometer and astronomer
Adriaan Isebree Moens (1846–1891), Dutch physician and physiologist
Adriaan Nicolaas Petrus Pelzer (1915–1981), South African Afrikaans academic, historian and author
Adriaan Hendrik Johan Prins (1921–2000), Dutch Africanist and maritime anthropologist
Adriaan Reland (1676–1718), Dutch Orientalist scholar, cartographer and philologist
Adriaan van Roomen (1561–1615), Flemish mathematician
Adriaan Joseph van Rossem (1892–1949), American ornithologist
Adriaan van Royen (1704–1779), Dutch botanist
Adriaan van den Spiegel (1578–1625), Flemish anatomist
Adriaen Verwer (c. 1655 – 1717), Dutch Mennonite merchant, scholar, philosopher and linguist
Adriaan Vlacq (1600–1667), Dutch book publisher and author of mathematical tables
Adriaan Wesselink (1909–1995), Dutch astronomer
Adriaan van Wijngaarden (1916–1987), Dutch mathematician and computer scientist
Adriaan van der Willigen Pz. (1810–1876), Dutch doctor and historian
Adriaan Cornelis Zaanen (1913–2003), Dutch mathematician

Sportspeople
Adriaan Botha (sprinter) (born 1977), South African sprinter
Adriaan Carelse (born 1995), South African rugby player
Adriaan Engelbrecht (born 1990), South African rugby player
Adriaan Fondse (born 1983), South African rugby player
Adriaan Katte (1900–1991), Dutch field hockey player
Adriaan Koonings (1895–1963), Dutch footballer
Adriaan Paulen (1902–1985), Dutch athlete and president of the IAAF
Adriaan Richter (born 1966), South African rugby player
Adriaan Strauss (born 1985), South African rugby player

Statesmen, religious leaders and military leaders
Adriaen Banckert (1615–1684), Dutch admiral
Adriaen Maertensz Block (1582–1661), successively captain, commander, and governor of the Ambon Island
Adriaan Boeyens (1459–1523), Dutch pope (Adrian VI)
Adriaan Dijxhoorn (1889–1953), Dutch Minister of Defence during the German invasion of the Netherlands in 1940
Adriaan Engelvaart (1812–1893), Dutch military commander and politician
Adriaan van Flodroff (died 1690), Dutch Major General of cavalry
Adriaan Florensz (1459–1523), Dutch pope (Adrian VI)
Adriaan van der Meyden (fl. 1653–63), Dutch Governor of Ceylon
Adriaan Pauw (1585–1653), Grand Pensionary of Holland
Adriaan van der Stel (died 1646), Dutch governor of Mauritius
Adriaan Valckenier (1695–1751), Governor-General of the Dutch East Indies from 1737 to 1741
Adriaan Vlok (born 1937), South African politician

Writers, actors, film directors
Adriaan van Dis (born 1946), Dutch author
Adriaan Ditvoorst (1940–1987), Dutch film director and screenwriter
Adriaan Kyvon (born 1947), Dutch comedian, television producer and screenwriter
Adriaan Loosjes (1761–1818), Dutch botanist, poet, novelist and publisher 
Adriaan van Hees (1910–1976), Dutch actor and member of the NSB
Adriaan van Meerbeeck (1563–1627), Flemish writer and translator
Adriaan Theodoor Peperzak (born 1929), Dutch educator, editor and author
Adriaan Poirters (1605–1674), Dutch Jesuit poet and prose writer
Adriaan Roland Holst (1888–1976), Dutch writer, nicknamed the "Prince of Dutch Poets"
Adriaan van Toor (born 1942), Dutch comedian

Other
Adriaen van Bergen (fl. 1590), devised the plot to recapture the city of Breda from the Spanish during the Eighty Years' War
Adriaen Block (1567–1627), Dutch private trader and navigator
Adriaen van der Donck (1618–1655), Dutch lawyer, landowner and ethnographer in New Netherland after whom Yonkers, New York is named
Adriaan Justus Enschedé (1829–1896), Dutch archivist, collector, printer and philanthropist
Adriaan van der Hoop (1778–1854), Dutch banker
Adriaan Pelt (1892–1981), Dutch journalist, international civil servant and diplomat
Adriaan van Ravesteijn (1938–2015), Dutch gallerist and art collector
Adriaan Stoop (1856–1935), Dutch oil explorer
Adriaen Jorissen Tienpoint (fl. 1624–26), Dutch explorer of the American East coast
Adriaan Schade van Westrum (1865–1917), Dutch-American newspaper editor
Adriaan A. van der Willigen (1910–1986), Dutch philatelist

Windmill
De Adriaan, Haarlem, a windmill in Haarlem, North Holland

Dutch masculine given names